Wagonwheel Blues is the debut album by American indie rock band The War on Drugs, released on June 19, 2008 on Secretly Canadian. Primarily a collaboration between founding members Adam Granduciel and Kurt Vile, it is the only studio album to feature contributions from drummer Kyle Lloyd.

Background and recording
Upon the album's release, vocalist and guitarist Adam Granduciel noted that the album's songs "each have their own little time frame spanning over the last six-to-seven years." Granduciel elaborated, "There are sounds on these songs from over eight years of home recording; bits and pieces here and there, dumped from cassettes, MiniDiscs, samplers, rough mixes run through amps and sampled, but most importantly all the performances are fresh and invigorating."

Critical reception

The album received generally positive reviews.

Track listing

Personnel

The War on Drugs
Adam Granduciel - vocals, electric and acoustic guitars, harmonica, drums, organs, samplers, rhodes, ms16, piano
Kurt Vile - electric and acoustic 12-string guitars, lead jazzmaster, vocals, OB-8, wurlitzer, trumpet, piano
David Hartley - electric bass (1 & 2)
Kyle Lloyd - drums, percussion, Casper (1 & 5)

Additional musicians
Paul Cobb - left and right drums (2)
Ryan Cobb - sweep guitar (2)

Recording personnel
Adam Granduciel - producer, recording (3, 4, 7 & 9), mixing (3, 4, 7 & 9)
Kurt Vile - producer
Jeff Zeigler - producer, recording (6 & 8), mixing (6 & 8)
Ryan Cobb - recording (1, 2 & 5)
Paul Cobb - recording (1, 2 & 5)
Michael Johnson - additional engineering
Kyle Lloyd - additional engineering
Brian McTear - mixing (2 & 5'')
John Martin - amplifier preparation

Artwork
Adam Granduciel - SX-70 photos
Daniel Murphy - art direction, layout

References

Secretly Canadian albums
The War on Drugs (band) albums
2008 debut albums
Albums produced by Adam Granduciel